C2S2 is an abbreviation that can stand for

Center for Climate and Sustainability Studies
Center for Circuit and System Solutions
Conservation Centers for Species Survival
Collaborative Center for Statistics in Science
C2S2 the chemical formula for ethenedithione.